The Waco CRG is an American open-cockpit sporting biplane of the early 1930s.

Development
The Waco CRG was designed specifically to win the 1930 Ford Air Tour, a  transcontinental reliability endurance race. Waco had previously won the race in both 1928 and 1929, and built two CRGs for the 1930 competition. The CRG is a conventional biplane with straight wings with a special M18 airfoil. The landing gear shock struts were extended and featured a tailskid. The  Wright Wright J-6-7 radial engine was initially fitted with a speedring cowling.

Operational history
Two CRGs were completed for the 1930 race. To prevent Waco from winning for a third time, Ford changed the rules so that only a Ford Trimotor could win. The CRGs achieved second and third paces in the transcontinental marathon, which started at the Ford Airport, now the Ford Motor Company's Dearborn, Michigan automobile testing site. The 1930 competition was over a  circular course passing around the U.S. Midwest and neighboring provinces of Canada.

NC600Y was flown by John H. Livingston and NC660Y by Art Davis, proprietor of the Air Circus bearing his name. 
Livingston's CRG, NC600Y, still survives. Davis' CRG ended its flying career as a cropduster in Greenville, Mississippi in 1938.  Waco CRG NC600Y was re-engined in 1939 with a  Wright R-760E-2 and was used by the Skywriting Corporation of America, for high altitude skywriting as the original Pepsi-Cola Skywriter.

Specifications (CRG)

References

Notes

Bibliography
Aerofiles.com

1930s United States civil utility aircraft
G series
Biplanes
Aircraft first flown in 1930